Anatoly Ivanovich Lepyoshkin (born 21 December 1938) is a retired Russian speed skater. He competed at the 1968 Winter Olympics and finished in 11th place in the 500 m event. 

In retirement Lepyoshkin worked as a speedskating coach in Novosibirsk. In 2001 he was attacked by thugs and ended in a coma due to a concussion and a knife wound in the chest.

References

External links
 

1938 births
Living people
Soviet male speed skaters
Speed skaters at the 1968 Winter Olympics
Olympic speed skaters of the Soviet Union